Verkhneilyinovka is a rural locality (a selo) and the administrative center of Verkhneilyinsky Selsoviet of Zavitinsky District, Amur Oblast, Russia. The population was 161 as of 2018. There are 8 streets.

Geography 
Verkhneilyinovka is located 37 km northeast of Zavitinsk (the district's administrative centre) by road. Boldyrevka is the nearest rural locality.

References 

Rural localities in Zavitinsky District